This is a complete listing of school districts in the Territory of the United States Virgin Islands:

 St. Croix School District - District Website
 St. Thomas-St. John School District - District Website

See also 
 University of the Virgin Islands

External links 
 The Virgin Islands Department of Education

Virgin Islands
school districts